The following is a list of stadiums at which rugby league is played, ordered by seating capacity. Currently all stadiums with a capacity of 5,000 or more which are the regular home venue of a club or national team, or are the regular hosts of a major competition (such as the State of Origin series, Magic Weekend, or the final of an annual national competition), are included. Stadiums for which the only rugby league use is hosting occasional matches or which have only hosted one-off rugby league tournaments are not included. Not all of these stadiums are primarily venues for rugby league, with some being primarily venues for another sport.

Current stadiums

Former or demolished stadiums

Future stadiums

See also
 List of Australian rugby league stadiums by capacity
 List of English rugby league stadiums by capacity

References

Lists of stadiums

Stadiums
Lists of sports venues with capacity